Puebla de los Ángeles is an outdoor sculpture installed in the city of Puebla's Zócalo, in the Mexican state of Puebla.

References

External links

 

Outdoor sculptures in Puebla (city)
Sculptures of angels
Statues in Puebla
Historic centre of Puebla